The Knoxville Convention Center is a 500,000-square-foot convention center in Knoxville, Tennessee, occupying the former location of the US Pavilion of the 1982 World's Fair. It offers  of exhibit space.

Design
The building was designed by the architecture firms Thompson, Ventulett, Stainback & Associates and McCarthy, Holsaple, McCarty. C.M. Kling & Associates were lighting designers. Its design was inspired by that of a Tennessee barn. It contains an exhibit hall, meeting rooms, auditorium, and a large ballroom. Its ballroom measures 27,000 square feet.

References

External links 

Knoxville Convention Center

Convention centers in Tennessee
Tourist attractions in Knoxville, Tennessee
Buildings and structures in Knoxville, Tennessee